John Hartburn (20 December 1920 – 22 January 2001) was an English footballer who played as a left winger in the Football League.

References

External links
Johnny Hartburn's Career

1920 births
2001 deaths
People from Houghton-le-Spring
Footballers from Tyne and Wear
English footballers
Association football wingers
Yeovil Town F.C. players
Queens Park Rangers F.C. players
Watford F.C. players
Millwall F.C. players
Leyton Orient F.C. players
Hillingdon Borough F.C. players
Guildford City F.C. players
English Football League players